Metamya bricenoi is a moth of the subfamily Arctiinae. It was described by Rothschild in 1911. It is found in Venezuela.

The wingspan is about 30 mm. The forewings are hyaline with black-brown veins and margins. The basal area is black-brown with a subbasal crimson point below the costa. There is a large black-brown discoidal patch conjoined to the costal area. The terminal band expands widely on the apical area and slightly below vein two. The hindwings are hyaline with black-brown veins and margins. The terminal band expands towards the apex and into a patch at the tornus.

References

 Natural History Museum Lepidoptera generic names catalog

Arctiinae
Moths described in 1911